BFTA may refer to:
 British Field Target Association, the governing body of Field target shooting in England, Scotland and Wales
 British Fur Trade Association
 Bradshaw Field Training Area, an area used for training by the Australian Army
 Baltic Free Trade Area, a former free trade agreement